The Cleveland Fusion is a women's professional American football team based in Cleveland, Ohio, United States. They play in the Women's Football Alliance. The Fusion played in the National Women's Football Association from their inception in 2002 until 2008. Home games are played at Mustang Stadium at Maple Heights High School.

History 
The Cleveland Fusion were founded in 2002. They joined the Women's Football Alliance in 2009 after seven seasons in the National Women's Football Association.

The team used to play at Bedford High School's Bearcat Stadium, as well as at Byers Field in Parma, Ohio. A number of players have been drawn from Cleveland-area colleges, including Case Western Reserve University.

T.J. Monachino took over the team before the 2017 season.

Multiple organizations have praised the Fusion for promoting gay pride and breaking down gender roles.

Season-by-season results 

|-
| colspan="6" align="center" | Cleveland Fusion (NWFA)
|-
|2002 || 6 || 3 || 0 || 2nd Great Lakes || Lost League Quarterfinal (Massachusetts) 
|-
|2003 || 7 || 3 || 0 || 2nd Northern Great Lakes || Won Northern Conference Quarterfinal (Baltimore)Lost Northern Conference Semifinal (Detroit)
|-
|2004 || 3 || 5 || 0 || 4th Northern Great Lakes || --
|-
|2005 || 5 || 3 || 0 || 10th Northern || --
|-
|2006 || 8 || 2 || 0 || 1st Northern North Central || Won League Wild Card (Philadelphia)Lost League Quarterfinal (Oklahoma City) 
|-
|2007 || 8 || 3 || 0 || 3rd Northern Central || Won Northern Conference Quarterfinal (Connecticut)Won Northern Conference Semifinal (Massachusetts)Lost Northern Conference Championship (Pittsburgh)
|-
|2008 || 5 || 3 || 0 || 2nd Northern Central || --
|-
| colspan="6" align="center" | Cleveland Fusion (WFA)
|-
|2009 || 4 || 4 || 0 || 3rd National Mid-Atlantic || --
|-
|2010 || 6 || 3 || 0 || 2nd National North Central || Lost National Conference Quarterfinal (St. Louis)
|-
|2011 || 5 || 3 || 0 || 2nd National Mid-Atlantic || --
|-
|2012 || 2 || 6 || 0 || 2nd National Mideast || --
|-
|2013 || 9 || 1 || 0 || 1st National North Central || Won National Conference Wild Card (West Michigan)Lost National Conference Quarterfinal (Chicago)
|-
|2014 || 7 || 3 || 0 || 2nd National Northeast || Won National Conference Wild Card (Indy)Lost National Conference Quarterfinal (Boston)
|-
|2015 || 6 || 3 || 0 || 2nd National Mid-Atlantic || Lost National Conference Quarterfinal (Chicago)
|-
|2016 || 4 || 5 || 0 || 6th National || Lost National Conference Quarterfinal (Boston)
|-
!Totals || 85 || 50 || 0
|colspan="2"| (including playoffs)

2015 roster

2009

Season Schedules

2010

Season Schedules

2011

Standings

Season Schedules

2012

Standings

Season schedule

2013

Standings

Season schedule

2014

Standings

Season schedule

2015

Standings

Season schedule

Logos

References

Cleveland Fusion

National Women's Football Association teams
American football teams in Cleveland
Women's Football Alliance teams
American football teams established in 2002
2002 establishments in Ohio
Women's sports in Ohio